Wilson Run is a  long 2nd order tributary to Sewickley Creek in Westmoreland County, Pennsylvania.

Course
Wilson Run rises about 0.5 miles northwest of Mount Pleasant, Pennsylvania, and then flows northwest to join Sewickley Creek at Paintersville.

Watershed
Wilson Run drains  of area, receives about 41.8 in/year of precipitation, has a wetness index of 368.30, and is about 51% forested.

References

 
Tributaries of the Ohio River
Rivers of Pennsylvania
Rivers of Westmoreland County, Pennsylvania
Allegheny Plateau